Yutai County is a county in the southwest of Shandong province, China. It is under the administration of Jining City and borders the Jiangsu counties of Feng and Pei to the south, Weishan County (and Weishan Lake) to the east, Rencheng District to the north, and Jinxiang County to the west.

Administrative divisions
As 2012, this county is divided to 7 towns and 3 townships.
Towns

Townships
Tangma Township
Laozhai Township
Luotun Township

Climate

References

 
Counties of Shandong
Jining